The 2006–07 New Mexico State Aggies men's basketball team represented New Mexico State University in the 2006–07 college basketball season. This was the second season for head coach Reggie Theus. The Aggies played their home games at Pan American Center and competed in the Western Athletic Conference. They finished the season 25–9, 11–5 in WAC play. They won the 2007 WAC men's basketball tournament to earn the conference's automatic bid to the 2007 NCAA Division I men's basketball tournament. They earned a 13 seed in the East Region where they were defeated by 4 seed Texas, and superstar freshman Kevin Durant, in the opening round.

Roster

Schedule and results

|-
!colspan=9 style=| Regular Season

|-
!colspan=9 style=| WAC Tournament

|-
!colspan=10 style=| NCAA Tournament

References

New Mexico State
New Mexico State Aggies men's basketball seasons
New Mexico State
Aggies
Aggies